Valashed-e Pain (also Romanized as Valāshed-e Pā’īn) is a village in Qareh Toghan Rural District, in the Central District of Neka County, Mazandaran Province, Iran. At the 2006 census, its population was 196, in 53 families.

References 

Populated places in Neka County